Torch FC, formerly Buxmont Torch FC, is an American soccer club currently competing in the NPSL. They play in the Keystone Conference of the National Premier Soccer League, the fourth tier of the United States soccer league system. Torch FC's home field is Pennridge High School Stadium in Perkasie, Bucks County, Pennsylvania.

Year-by-year

Current squad

References 
 Official Site
National Premier Soccer League Profile
Soccerway Profile

National Premier Soccer League teams
Amateur soccer teams in Pennsylvania
Soccer clubs in Pennsylvania
2009 establishments in Pennsylvania
Association football clubs established in 2009